NA-150 Multan-III is a constituency for the National Assembly of Pakistan.

Election 2002 

General elections were held on 10 Oct 2002. Rana Mehmood Ul Hassan of PML-N won by 22,387 votes.

Election 2008 

General elections were held on 18 Feb 2008. Rana Mehmood Ul Hassan of PML-N won by 37,564 votes.

Election 2013 

General elections were held on 11 May 2013. Makhdoom Shah Mehmood Qureshi of Pakistan tehreek insaf won by 92,761 votes and became the  member of National Assembly.

Election 2018

By-election 2023 
A by-election will be held on 16 March 2023 due to the resignation of Shah Mahmood Qureshi, the previous MNA from this seat.

See also
NA-149 Multan-II
NA-151 Multan-IV

References

External links 
Election result's official website

NA-150